Benizelos Roufos (1795–1868) was a Greek politician and Prime Minister of Greece.

Biography

Early life
Roufos was born in Patras in 1795, a scion of the wealthy Roufos-Kanakaris family. He was the son of Athanasios Kanakaris who fought during the Greek War of Independence.

Career
During the government of Ioannis Kapodistrias (1828–1830), Roufos became governor of Elis. Later he would also serve as Foreign Minister. In 1855, Roufos was elected Mayor of Patras, a post he held for three years. When King Otto was exiled in 1862, Roufos became one of three viceroys - along with Konstantinos Kanaris and Dimitrios Voulgaris - that held power from 10 October 1862 until 19 October 1863. Roufos served twice times as Prime Minister of Greece, with his first term interrupted for a few days in June 1863.

Death
Roufos died in Patras on 18 March 1868.

References

1795 births
1868 deaths
19th-century prime ministers of Greece
MPs of Patras
Prime Ministers of Greece
Members of the Greek Senate
Ministers of the Interior of Greece
Benizelos
French Party politicians
Politicians from Patras
Mayors of Patras